Acrimony was a Welsh heavy metal band from Swansea who was active during the 1990s. Releasing their debut album in 1994, they are regarded as the pioneers of stoner metal in the United Kingdom, and an important influence upon the scene. Although the band never achieved mainstream success, during their career they received much critical acclaim – they were nominated for the Kerrang! Best Newcomer award and earned top review ratings. Acrimony have maintained a cult following in the British metal scene, their records reportedly selling for vast sums as collectors items. AllMusic described their musical style as a "powerful blend of Black Sabbath’s heavy metal riffery, Hawkwind's space rock excursions, and Blue Cheer's fuzzed-out psychedelic feedback." In 2019, Kerrang! listed Acrimony as part of "20 bands who didn't get the respect they deserved".

Present day
Since their split in 1999, Stu O'Hara went on to play guitar in Iron Monkey before the outfit disbanded, then he went on to form the Dukes of Nothing with other ex-Iron Monkey members and members of Orange Goblin. Lee 'Roy' went on to form Swansea-based crust, power violence six-piece Black Eye Riot along with Stu and Dorian. Darren and Mead formed the 9ine, and Mead has his own trance project Yeti. Lee 'Roy' Davies now plays in the heavy metal band Lifer. In 2008 Stu, Mead, Darren and Dorian re-grouped and wrote tracks as Sigiriya, releasing an album called Return to Earth in 2011. A change of vocalist came in Matt "Pipes" Williams for 2013 release Darkness Died Today. Lee 'Roy' formed Woven Man and released their debut album entitled Revelry (In Our Arms) in January 2019.

In November 2019, Acrimony's three albums, Hymns to the Stone, Tumuli Shroomaroom and Bong On - Live Long! were reissued in 3CD digipack and remastered edition by the Dutch music label Burning World Records.

Band members
Dorian "Dexter" Walters – vocals
Stuart O'Hara – guitar
Matthew Lee "Roy" Davies – guitar
Paul "Mead" Bidmead – bass
Darren Ivey – drums

Former members 
David "Dai" Jones – Bass

Discography

Albums

EPs and Singles

Compilation appearances
1996 – "Earthchild Inferno" on Dark Passages Volume II, later included on Bong On - Live Long!
1997 – "Bud Song" on Burn One Up
1998 – "Find The Path" on Stoned Revolution
1998 – "O Baby" on Peaceville X, later included on Bong On - Live Long!
1999 – "Tumuli Shroomaroom" on Rise 13: Magick Rock Volume 1
2001 – "Satellite 19" on 21st Century Media Blitz Volume II
2003 – "And the Story Ends" on Tales From the Underworld: A Tribute to Blind Guardian

References

External links

Official Acrimony website
Acrimony on Leaf Hound Records
Acrimony on BBC Wales

Welsh stoner rock musical groups
Musical groups established in 1991
Musical groups disestablished in 1999
Musical groups from Swansea
Musical quintets
1991 establishments in England